Matthias Trentsensky, or Mathäus Trentsensky (30 August 1790 Vienna - 19 March 1868 Vienna), son of Mathäus Trentsensky (1754 Schemnitz - 1818 Vienna), was a Viennese publisher and engraver of Hungarian origin. He published colour plates of soldiers' uniforms, folk and theatre costumes, toy or paper theatres, and educational posters or wall charts of plants and animals.

Biography
Matthias Trentsensky served in the Austrian army, and took part in the campaigns of 1814-1815 against the French. In 1815 he retired with the rank of lieutenant (infantry). He studied engraving art and worked in the lithographic workshop of Adolph Friedrich Kunike in Vienna, and in 1819, together with his younger brother Joseph Trentsensky (1794-1839), opened his own lithographic publishing and office supply company (Papierwarenhandlung).

They released a significant number of lithographs depicting the uniforms of the Austrian army and battle scenes, as well as theatrical costumes, images of animals and popular prints for children. They also sold the popular "Mandelbogen" for children, which were embossed toy proscenium arches to be cut out or painted. From 1837 the company was run by Matthias alone and after his death by his widow.

The printing house was initially located in Ungargasse then in Erdbergstraße. The warehouse and sales rooms started in Zwettlhof and from 1842 in Domherrenhof. In 1822 he received a patent for the production of lithographs using zinc plates, and in 1829 one for wooden blocks.

Matthias was married to Maria Anna Kurzweil, who died on 3 August 1874 at Perchtoldsdorf. His brother Joseph Trentsensky (9 August 1794 - 24 January 1839) was married to Bianca Westermann and they lived in Rasumofskygasse in Leopoldstadt.

References

External links

Trentsensky-Bühne @ Papiertheatre
Gallery of works @ Impereur (blogspot)

Austrian printers
Austrian publishers (people)
1790 births
1868 deaths
Austrian lithographers
Businesspeople from Vienna